Lungelo Gosa (born 31 January 1995) is a South African rugby union player, currently playing with the Border Bulldogs of the Currie Cup First Division for 2021 season. His regular position is fly-half or fullback.

Rugby career

2011–2013: Schoolboy rugby

Gosa was born in King William's Town in the Eastern Cape and attended the East London-based Selborne College. He played first team rugby for the school, also captaining the side in 2013.

2014–2016: Sevens / Golden Lions

After high school, Gosa concentrated on playing rugby sevens. He represented the South Africa Sevens Academy team at several international tournaments in 2014, 2015 and 2016 – and was also named in an extended training squad for the team as they prepared for the 2016 Summer Olympics – but failed to break into the national team.

Gosa also returned to the fifteen-man form of the sport towards the end of 2015, making two appearances for the Johannesburg-based 's Under-21 team in the Under-21 Provincial Championship.

2016: Eastern Province Kings

In August 2016, Gosa was contracted by the cash-strapped  for the 2016 Currie Cup Premier Division. He started as a fullback in their defeat to the  before reverting to the bench for their final two matches in a season that saw the EP Kings fail to win any of their matches to finish bottom of the log.

2017: Leopards

Other sports

In addition to rugby, Gosa also played hockey at high school level and represented Border at cricket at Under-19 level.

References

South African rugby union players
Living people
1995 births
People from Qonce
Rugby union fly-halves
Rugby union fullbacks
Eastern Province Elephants players
Universiade medalists in rugby sevens
Universiade silver medalists for South Africa
Medalists at the 2019 Summer Universiade
Leopards (rugby union) players
Border Bulldogs players
SWD Eagles players
Rugby union players from the Eastern Cape